Ama Sodogah (born 11 March 1961) is a Togolese boxer. He competed in the men's lightweight event at the 1984 Summer Olympics.

References

External links
 

1961 births
Living people
Togolese male boxers
Olympic boxers of Togo
Boxers at the 1984 Summer Olympics
Place of birth missing (living people)
Lightweight boxers
21st-century Togolese people